The flex model is a method of teaching for students who are non-traditional learners. Learning material and instructions are given online and the lessons are self-guided. The teacher is available on-site. The students work independently and learn to develop and create new concepts in a digital environment. They work in computer labs most of the time. The schedules of learning modalities are customized individually and the teacher-of-record is on-site. Though most of the instructions are given online, the face-to-face support as needed by the student is given by the teacher-of-records and adults through activities such as group projects, small group instruction and individual tutoring. This model provides the students a flexible learning environment. They are free to arrive and leave the learning premises within the given timing of the day. The teacher in this model acts as a mentor and give equal importance in delivering the proper instruction to the students.

Advantages
 Students will be able to carry out the learning process at their own pace.
 There is a facilitation of credit accumulation during the course of learning.
 The school operates at a lower cost compared to alternative schools.

Disadvantages
 This model demands larger spaces and many devices.

See also
Blended learning
Distance learning
Educational technology
Personalized learning
Rotation model of learning
Self-blended model of learning

References

Infographics
Teaching